California is a state located in the Western United States. It is the most populous state and the third largest by area after Alaska and Texas.

California has been inhabited by numerous Native American peoples since antiquity. The Spanish, the Russians, and other Europeans began exploring and colonizing the area in the 16th and 17th centuries, with the Spanish establishing its first California mission at what is now San Diego in 1769. After the Mexican Cession of 1848, the California Gold Rush brought worldwide attention to the area. The growth of the movie industry in Los Angeles, high tech in San Francisco and Silicon Valley, tourism, agriculture, and other areas in the ensuing decades fueled the creation of a $3 trillion economy , which would rank fifth in the world if the state were a sovereign nation.

California is divided into 58 counties and contains 482 municipalities. One, San Francisco, is a consolidated city-county. California law makes no distinction between "city" and "town", and municipalities may use either term in their official names. They can be organized as either a charter municipality, governed by its own charter, or a general-law municipality (or "code city"), governed by state statute.

The first municipality to incorporate was Sacramento on February 27, 1850, while the most recent was Jurupa Valley on July 1, 2011. Eight cities were incorporated before the state's September 9, 1850, admission to the Union.



Municipalities

See also

List of cities in Los Angeles County, California
List of cities and towns in the San Francisco Bay Area
List of communities in California
List of counties in California
List of largest cities in California by population
List of places in California

References

+Cities and towns
California
California